Krzysztof Baszkiewicz (27 October 1933 - 25 November 1993) was a Polish international footballer who played as a midfielder for Lechia Gdańsk and Gwardia Warsaw.

Biography

Baszkiewicz started his career playing football for the youth levels at OMTUR Bielany and Construction Wola, joining Lechia Gdańsk in 1950. Baszkiewicz made his league debut against Polonia Świdnica, scoring his first goal for the club in the same match. In total he played 40 times scoring 18 goals with Lechia before the age of 20. In 1953 he joined Gwardia Warsaw, playing the next 11 seasons with the club. In total for Gwardia he played 173 times in the league, scoring 66 goals and he became the first Polish player to score in a European club competition in 1955 scoring against Djurgårdens in Sweden. At the age of 27 Baszkiewicz suffered from injuries, retiring at the age of 30 having played rarely in his final 3 seasons. Baszkiewicz played 20 times for the Poland national team scoring 4 times for his country.

References

1933 births
1993 deaths
Lechia Gdańsk players
Gwardia Warsaw players
Polish footballers
Footballers from Warsaw
Association football forwards
Poland international footballers